Fictitious people are nonexistent people, who, unlike fictional people, have been claimed to actually exist. Usually this is done as a practical joke or hoax, but sometimes fictitious people are 'created' as part of a fraud. Sometimes the line between the two categories is blurred, e.g., as in the case of Abdul Alhazred. A pseudonym may also be considered by some to be a "fictitious person", although this is not the correct definition.

Hoaxes
 William Ashbless, a 19th-century fictitious poet and adventurer.
 Bilitis, nonexistent Ancient Greek poet. Supposed author of The Songs of Bilitis, a collection of erotic poetry "discovered" by Pierre Louÿs.
 Achmet Borumborad, a late 18th-century doctor and businessman in Dublin, purportedly from Constantinople. 
 George P. Burdell, eternal Georgia Tech student.
 Eddie Burrup, fake Australian aboriginal painter.
 Johnny "The Celestial Comet" Chung, supposed Chinese-American football player for the nonexistent Plainfield Teacher's College.
 Allegra Coleman, nonexistent supermodel.
 Tom Collins, fictitious gossip and namesake of the gin-and-lemon-based cocktail.
 Helen Demidenko, nonexistent Ukrainian author, created by Australian writer Helen Darville.
 Aimi Eguchi, fictional Japanese idol.  Member of idol group AKB48 created as a composite of the other members.
 Frederick R. Ewing, nonexistent author of I, Libertine.
 Hugo N. Frye, a fictional figure, purportedly the founder of the Republican Party in New York State, made up by Cornell University students in 1930 as a prank designed to embarrass several state politicians.
 Anthony Godby Johnson, (probably) fictitious author of Rock and a Hard Place: One Boy's Triumphant Story.
 Kilroy, a nonexistent legendary World War II US Army major who inspired millions during the war and became part of American popular culture.
 Ern Malley, nonexistent Australian poet, created by Australian poets James McAuley and Harold Stewart.
Lillian Virginia Mountweazel, a photographer who existed as a fictitious entry in the 4th edition of the New Columbia Encyclopedia. The publishers assumed that if they caught another encyclopedia containing their copyright trap, the presence of the non-existent Mountweazel would prove that their competitors hadn’t done any original research and copied them.
Lucian Yahoo Dragoman, a nonexistent baby supposedly named after Yahoo!.
 Karyl Robin-Evans, nonexistent scientist whose expedition is chronicled in the book Sungods in Exile.
 H. Rochester Sneath, nonexistent English public school headmaster and prolific letter writer, created by Humphry Berkeley.
 Georg Paul Thomann, nonexistent Austrian conceptual artist, created by art group monochrom to represent Austria at the 2002 Sao Paulo Art Biennial. Georg Paul Thomann is featured in RE/Search's "Pranks 2" book.
 Piotr Zak, nonexistent Polish composer, created for a BBC programme by Susan Bradshaw and Hans Keller.

Pseudonyms
This list includes pseudonyms supplied with a biography suggesting the existence of a person distinct from the actual person with the pseudonym in question, often with the purpose of a hoax.

See also :Category:Collective pseudonyms (many of them were not claimed as "real" people). 

 Penelope Ashe, supposed "demure Long Island housewife" who authored Naked Came The Stranger. Actually a pseudonym of a collective of writers, and portrayed by one of their relatives during interviews.
 Richard Bachman, a pseudonym of Stephen King, given a fake biography and author photo.
Silence Dogood, a false persona used by Benjamin Franklin to get his work published.
 Roderick Jaynes, editor of all the films of Joel and Ethan Coen. Actually a pseudonym for the Coens themselves.  "Jaynes", supposedly a cantankerous Englishman in his 80s, has also penned a dismissive introduction to a book of the Coens' scripts, and an article in The Guardian discussing his work on The Man Who Wasn't There.
 Kozma Prutkov, arrogant Russian writer and government official, who published bombastic pieces that ended up being satirical commentary on Russian bureaucracy.  A creation of 4 Russian writers, including Aleksey Konstantinovich Tolstoy (1817-1875) and Alexei Zhemchuzhnikov.
 Lemony Snicket, a pseudonym used by Daniel Handler for his A Series of Unfortunate Events. Snicket, who is also a character in the books, is the meta-fictional narrator of the series. 
 Wrench Tuttle, an Atlanta-based "poet, traveler, activist and philosopher". Canadian musician/composer Bob Wiseman "collaborated" with lyricist Tuttle by mail, for the 1989 album In Her Dream: Bob Wiseman Sings Wrench Tuttle. Tuttle was, in reality, Wiseman.
Kilgore Trout originally was a character created by Kurt Vonnegut, who later became a pseudonym used by Philip José Farmer to publish, as a homage to Vonnegut, an actual version of one of the fictional Trout's books, Venus on the Half-Shell (1975). Farmer's work is based on a moment in Vonnegut's God Bless You, Mr. Rosewater that describes a character reading a copy of Trout's novel, "Venus on the Half-Shell". Vonnegut was not happy about the publication of Farmer's book, but he declined to sue over the use of his intellectual property.
 Gerald Wiley, authorial pseudonym used by sketch comedy performer Ronnie Barker on shows in which he was a performer. Initially, even other writers on the show were unaware that sketches submitted by "Wiley" were in fact written by Barker; Barker wanted his sketches to be judged on merit, not on the fact he was a cast member or star.
Andrew MacDonald, a pseudonym for William Luther Pierce, white supremacist and author of The Turner Diaries.

Arts and entertainment
Alan Smithee, name used by film directors who wish to disown a project.
Andreas Karavis, nonexistent Greek poet.
B. Traven, adventure novelist.
Borat Sagdiyev, a fictitious Kazakhstani journalist created by Sacha Baron Cohen, see also Ali G and Brüno Gehard.
 Conchita (previously Conchita Wurst), stage persona of Austrian recording artist Thomas Neuwirth.
C.W. Blubberhouse, whose letters in UK national newspapers were exposed as a hoax by the Sunday Times.
Dame Edna Everage and Sir Les Patterson, characters played by Australian comedian Barry Humphries.
Darko Maver, a lauded fictional Yugoslav artist whose gruesome sculptures turned out to be photos of real murders found on rotten.com by Eva and Franco Mattes.
 David J. Broadfoot, the Member of Parliament from Kicking Horse Pass, representing the New Apathetic Party, a character played by Canadian comedian Dave Broadfoot.
David Manning, a nonexistent film critic created by Sony Corporation.
 Donald Kaufman, fictional brother of Adaptation writer Charlie Kaufman, gained "writing credits" and was nominated for an Oscar.
George Spelvin, traditional pseudonyms used in programs in American theater.
Gerald Bostock, writer of the lyrics for the Jethro Tull album Thick as a Brick.
Hajime Yadate, credited as the creator of most of the anime works of Japanese animation studio Sunrise.
JT LeRoy, fictional American author and literary celebrity.
Lily Savage, a character played by British comedian Paul O'Grady.
Margaret B. Jones, fictitious half-white, half-Native American foster child and Bloods gang member in South Central Los Angeles
Mrs. Trellis of North Wales, a regular correspondent to BBC radio comedy I'm Sorry I Haven't A Clue
Nat Tate, fake 1950s American artist
Ossian, Irish bard created by James Macpherson in the 18th century
P. D. Q. Bach, a fictional composer invented by musical satirist "Professor" Peter Schickele.
Ponsonby Britt, executive producer of The Rocky and Bullwinkle Show. In the credits of George of the Jungle, a later offering from the same production company, Britt had been promoted to "Ponsonby Britt OBE" (recipient of the Order of the British Empire).
Rrose Sélavy, a fictional artist created by Marcel Duchamp
S. Morgenstern, fictional author from the equally fictional country of Florin
 Super Dave Osborne, a character played by American comedian and actor Bob Einstein.
Sven, an occasional stand-in for Samantha on BBC radio comedy I'm Sorry I Haven't A Clue.
Tony Clifton, imaginary lounge singer created (and usually played) by comedian Andy Kaufman
Van den Budenmayer, nonexistent Dutch composer believed to be real by some filmgoers even after they were told the truth.
Walter Plinge, name used by British stage actors who wish to stay anonymous
Wanda Koolmatrie, nonexistent Australian aboriginal author

Academia
 Arthur Besse, pseudonym used since 1978 by French differential geometers
 Blanche Descartes, fictitious mathematician with over 30 published papers
 Claude Émile Jean-Baptiste Litre, volumetric namesake.
 Dr. Irving Joshua Matrix, numerologist, invented by Martin Gardner
 G. W. Peck, pseudonym used by several mathematicians since 1979 
 H. Rochester Sneath, nonexistent headmaster of the nonexistent Selhurst School
 Honorable J. Fortescue, fake US physician
 Jára Cimrman, fictional Czech genius and polymath
 John Rainwater, enrolled by mathematics graduate students at the University of Washington in 1952 as a prank; has since been used as a pseudonym by several other mathematicians for published work
 Josiah Carberry, professor of psychoceramics at Brown University
 Nicolas Bourbaki, a 20th-century French mathematician with credited publications
 Peter Orno, associated with Ohio State University and credited with several papers in mathematics during the 20th century

Politics
 Andre Kasongo Ilunga, a member of the UNAFEC party and Minister of National Economy and Trade of the Democratic Republic of the Congo in 2007.
 Jakob Maria Mierscheid, a member of the German Bundestag. Despite not existing, Mierscheid has an official Parliamentary biography (complete with portrait) and has given his name to a bridge spanning the River Spree and to the Mierscheid Law, which has been used to predict voting patterns in the former West Germany.

Covert operations
 Major William Martin, RM, a dead courier found floating off the coast of Spain possessing documents outlining future Allied strategy. The documents were misinformation planted by the Security Service as part of Operation Mincemeat, a World War II deception plan to cover the invasion of Sicily.

Sports
 Masal Bugduv, nonexistent 16-year-old Moldovan football player linked with a move to numerous top clubs in Europe.
 Lennay Kekua, nonexistent deceased girlfriend of former Notre Dame linebacker Manti Te'o.
 Sidd Finch, nonexistent baseball prodigy created by George Plimpton for an April Fool's Day prank.
 Taro Tsujimoto, nonexistent Japanese hockey player selected by Buffalo Sabres general manager Punch Imlach in the 1974 NHL Draft.

Unclassified
Please help in putting them into appropriate sections.
 Araki Yasusada, fake Hiroshima survivor and author
 Betty Crocker, fake spokesperson for The Washburn Crosby Company of Minneapolis and its successor company, General Mills
 Carl Brandon, a fictional fan of color, for whom the Carl Brandon Society was named
 Clay Bertrand, an alleged alias associated with two people connected to various investigations regarding the assassination of President John F. Kennedy
 Edna Welthorpe, nonexistent morality campaigner
 Henry Root, fictitious correspondent, and Henry Raddick (possibly the same person)
 Kaycee Nicole, fictional leukemia sufferer and Internet personality
 Kodee Kennings, nonexistent 8-year-old girl whose letters were published in the Daily Egyptian, a student newspaper for Southern Illinois University Carbondale
 Mavis Beacon, fictitious typing tutor created for the Mavis Beacon Teaches Typing application software.
 R. M. Qualtrough, a key figure in the murder trial of William Herbert Wallace
 Titusz Dugovics, the hero of Belgrade

References